Bushnell is an unincorporated community in Barton County, in the U.S. state of Missouri.

History
A post office called Bushnell was established in 1888, and remained in operation until 1901. The community was named after its founder, Andy Bushnell.

References

Unincorporated communities in Barton County, Missouri
Unincorporated communities in Missouri